Force B was a Royal Navy task force during the Second World War. 

It may also refer to:

Indian Expeditionary Force B, part of the Allied force sent to German East Africa during World War I.
Task Force B, part of the South Vietnamese Civil Guards Dinh Tuong Regiment at the Battle of Ap Bac, 1962.
Corps Detachment B, part of the German 8th Army at the Battle of the Korsun–Cherkassy Pocket.
B-Force, Swedish black metal musician
Cruiser Force B, the British naval unit enforcing the economic blockade of Germany in World War I. Also called the Northern Patrol.